The Michelson Prize and Grants in Reproductive Biology Program is a $75 million (USD) initiative to create a safe and effective, single-dose, nonsurgical sterilant for male and female cats and dogs. It includes a $25 million (USD) prize for the first entity to develop a product that meets a series of criteria, which include: a single-dose, permanent, nonsurgical sterilant; safe and effective in male and female cats and dogs, ablates sex steroids and/or their effects, suitable for administration in a field setting, viable pathway to regulatory approval, and reasonable manufacturing process and cost. The program has also committed up to $50 million (USD) in grant funding for promising research in pursuit of a sterilant that meets these criteria. To date, $15.5 million funds have been committed to 37 projects.

The prize was established in October 2008 by the Found Animals Foundation, a 501(c)(3), non-profit organization dedicated to reducing the number of animals entering shelters each year and increasing the positive outcomes for animals already in the shelter system. It focuses on developing cost-effective, scalable, and sustainable animal welfare business models. Funded by Dr. Gary K. Michelson, an orthopedic surgeon, inventor and entrepreneur, the Michelson Prize and Grants Program seeks to make sterilization for cats and dogs globally accessible and affordable worldwide through a high-volume, low-profit model.

See also

 List of biology awards

References

External links
 Official Found Animals Web Site

Awards established in 2008
Biology awards